The Fake Sound of Progress (stylized as thefakesoundofprogress) is the debut studio album by the Welsh rock band Lostprophets, originally released on 27 November 2000 through Visible Noise. The album would be released in 2001 by Columbia Records and was met with stronger sales numbers around the world. This is the only album to feature DJ Stepzak although he was only in the original version, and the first album to have Jamie Oliver although he was only in the remastered version.

The album peaked at number 186 on the Billboard 200, selling over 120,000 copies in the United States alone, and reached high positions on charts worldwide. Two singles were released from the album: "Shinobi vs. Dragon Ninja" and "The Fake Sound of Progress"; these singles helped Lostprophets reach mainstream popularity. In 2010, the album was certified platinum by the BPI in the United Kingdom.

Style 
The Fake Sound of Progress is a nu metal album that incorporates elements of heavy metal, hip hop, funk and jazz.

Recording 
The band began work on the album in 2000, after finding a suitable bass player. Much of the album started as quickly-recorded demos from The Fake Sound of Progress EP. The song "MOAC Supreme" became "A Thousand Apologies", and "Directions" was released as the B-side for the single "Shinobi vs. Dragon Ninja". The album was recorded in one week for around £4000, and while originally intended as another demo, went on to be released on Visible Noise Records in late 2000. Because of the album's shortened recording process, the band were unhappy with the end result. The title of their second studio album Start Something refers to this, as they felt it better reflected their music abilities.

When the band signed to Columbia Records in 2001, it was partly re-recorded, remixed, and re-released that same year. The changes to the music, such as merging the interludes between tracks with the ends of songs, was met with chagrin by fans of the earlier release. The title track of the album, in addition to being partially re-recorded, was also sped up significantly. The remastered version of the album was released in 2001 in the UK and US respectively, and was produced by Michael Barbiero.

Release 
The album didn't initially receive much attention, but entered the Billboard 200 chart following the release of the first single from the album, "Shinobi vs. Dragon Ninja". On Friday 1 March 2002 the album was certified Silver by the British Phonographic Industry (BPI) and on Friday 26 April 2002 the album was certified Gold by the British Phonographic Industry. According to Rolling Stone the album has sold more than 120 thousand copies in the United States and 250 thousand copies in the United Kingdom.

At the end of April 2002, The Fake Sound of Progress peaked at 186 on the Billboard 200, 13 on the Top Heatseekers, 9 on the Top Heatseekers West North Central and 8 on the Top Heatseekers Mountain chart in the United States. The album first charted on the UK Albums Chart at 116 in 2001, in 2002 it peaked at its peak position 44 and after the release of Start Something in 2004 the album re-charted and peaked at 166. Two singles were released from the album;"Shinobi vs. Dragon Ninja" which peaked at 33 on the Hot Modern Rock Tracks chart, and "The Fake Sound of Progress", which peaked at 21 on the UK Singles chart without charting abroad.

Reception 

When released, the album was met with mixed reviews by music critics. Allmusic reviewer Brian O'Neil gave the album two out of five stars and said that "the only redeeming quality is the great production by Michael Barbiero, that allows all instruments to be heard perfectly in all their ennui-inducing glory, proving that no matter how much you polish up a turd, it's still a turd." Ben Rayner from Drowned in Sound however gave the album 10 out of 10 stars and quoted "in the world of Lost Prophets it's very easy to find something different with every listen with their non-chaotic but well textured tunes." NME reviewer John Mulvey called the album "weirdly impressive", while no stars were given the album got a positive review.

Tour 
After the release of the album, Lostprophets went on a tour in Europe and America. Before the release of "Shinobi vs. Dragon Ninja", the band went on a brief tour with the fellow British rock band Muse. They toured Austria and Germany together from 21–27 October 2001. The band would also tour for the NME Carling Awards Tour which featured dates in the London Astoria among others. They also took part in the successful Nu-Titans tour with Defenestration and other famous British metal bands. The band subsequently toured on the Irish leg of Ozzfest. They had also played at the Glastonbury and the Reading and Leeds Festivals. In 2002, the band headlined the Deconstruction Tour in Finsbury Park, London on 3 June; supporting acts were Mighty Mighty Bosstones, The Mad Caddies among other well-known artists. In October, Lostprophets returned to the UK for a tour visiting big cities such as Glasgow, Manchester and London.

Track listing
All lyrics written by Ian Watkins, all music composed by Lostprophets.

Personnel

2000 original
Lostprophets
 Ian Watkins – vocals, art direction
 Lee Gaze – lead guitar
 Mike Lewis – rhythm guitar
 Stuart Richardson – bass guitar
 DJ Stepzak - synth, turntables, samples
 Mike Chiplin – drums, percussion

Production
 Dan Sprigg – production, mixing
 Guy Davie – mastered, mixing
 Neil Harding – mastered, mixing
 Jamie Travers – recording, additional production
 Julie Weir – Visible Noise A&R

2001 remaster
Lostprophets
 Ian Watkins – vocals, art direction
 Lee Gaze – lead guitar
 Mike Lewis  – rhythm guitar
 Stuart Richardson – bass guitar
 Jamie Oliver – synth, turntables, samples
 Mike Chiplin - drums, percussion 

Production
 Dan Sprigg – production, mixing, recording
 Vlado Meller – mastered
 Michael Barbiero – additional production, additional mixing
 Julie Weir – Visible Noise A&R
 Gerard Babitts – Colombia A&R

Chart positions

Albums

Singles

Certifications

Release history

Footnotes

External links

The Fake Sound of Progress (11-track version) at YouTube (streamed copy where licensed)

Lostprophets albums
Columbia Records albums
Nu metal albums by British artists